"The Border" is a song written by Russ Ballard and Dewey Bunnell and performed by America. The song appears on their 1983 album, Your Move. 

Released as a single in 1983, the song became the band's final Top 40 hit, reaching No. 33 on the Billboard Hot 100. However, it fared much better on the Adult Contemporary chart, peaking at No. 4. The song reached No. 22 in the Netherlands.

Charts

References

1983 singles
America (band) songs
Songs written by Russ Ballard
Songs written by Dewey Bunnell
Capitol Records singles
1983 songs